Pewhairangi is a surname of New Zealand Maori origin. Notable people with the surname include:

Api Pewhairangi (born 1992), New Zealand-born Irish rugby league footballer
Ngoi Pēwhairangi (1921–1985), New Zealand Maori Teacher of Maori language 

Māori-language surnames